JetCat is a young female superhero who "flies like a jet, and fights like a cat", created by Jay Stephens (of Tutenstein and The Secret Saturdays fame), who first appeared in the weekly comic strip "Oddville!" beginning in 1994. The character resurfaced as the star of the 1997 Dark Horse Comics mini-series, "The Land Of Nod", which was later collected as the multiple Eisner-Award nominated The Land Of Nod Rockabye Book. Jetcat next appeared in four animated shorts that aired in the final two seasons of Nickelodeon's KaBlam!., which was nominated for an Annie Award. In 2001, Jetcat starred in a new comic book miniseries for Oni Press titled 'Jetcat Clubhouse', and returned to her original town of Oddville in the weekly comic strip series, 'Welcome to... Oddville!', which ran in the Toronto Star's Brand New Planet from 2003-2007. This was later collected into the complete 'Welcome to... Oddville!' book by Adhouse Books.

Characters
Melanie McCay (later Melanie Ilk after her mother's remarriage): An elementary school girl who is best friends with Tod Johnson, and can transform into a feline superhero named JetCat. In the KaBlam shorts she is voiced by Ashley Michelle.
Tod Johnson: Melanie's best friend who threatens to tell everyone about her Jetcat identity. In the KaBlam shorts, he is voiced by Grady Larkin.
Two-Fisted Five: An Oddville-based superhero team that JetCat belongs to. Also includes Snakefist, Teen Idol, Neon Varmint, and the Suburbanaut.
Jumbo Head: Star of a cartoon series that both Melanie and Tod adore. A live-action movie was spun off in the last Kablam short but Melanie didn't think the actor would be Jumbo-Head to her.

Villains

Vicky Von Verman: An unspecified insect-like pest with an Eastern European accent who planned to transform JetCat into a were-moth. Voiced by Susan Silo in the short “I Was a Grade School Weremoth.”
Bella Kiss: A diminutive monster man who was teased a lot in his childhood and speaks in a Transylvanian accent. He also seems to own hyenas as pets. He is voiced by Paul Eiding in the short “Project Evil”
Moby Doc: A mad whale/human hybrid scientist that tried to steal the water from the Wetpark and all of Oddville but was thawed out by JetCat. He claims to be endangered. Voiced by Paul Eiding in the short “Lunchtime.”

Episodes
</onlyinclude>

References

External links
 Jay Stephen's website on Jetcat

Comics publications
Animated series
Cartoon mascots
Mascots
KaBlam!
Canadian comics characters